"River" is a song by Australian electronic trio Pnau and New Zealand electropop singer-songwriter, Ladyhawke and released on 11 December 2020.

At the AIR Awards of 2021, the song was nominated for Best Independent Dance, Electronica or Club Single.

At the APRA Music Awards of 2022, the song was nominated for Most Performed Dance/Electronic Work.

Background and release
From 2004-2007, Pnau's Nick Littlemore and Phillipa "Pip" Brown (later known as Ladyhawke) formed the art rock and dance band Teenager. The band was a side-project for Littlemore who was part of Sydney dance music trio, Pnau.

In 2007, Ladyhawke provided uncredited vocals on the song "Embrace" which was released in June 2008 as the third and final single from the Pnau's third studio album, Pnau. "Embrace" peaked at number 55 on the ARIA Charts. Pnau and Ladyhawke did not collaborate with each between 2007 and 2020.

In 2020, Pnau approached Ladyhawke to work together again on something new. In working with Ladyhawke once again, Pnau's Nick Littlemore said "It seems every time we've collaborated with her it's been incendiary. We met a long while ago; within moments of meeting it was clear we had a deep connection. This tune is a combination of Ladyhawke's brilliance and the inspiring work of Sam and Peter. I really believe this song is the living proof of magic; all the elements coming together just right. I hope with all sincerity that you experience the joy we did in making it."

Ladyhawke's said "I've always had a unique connection with Nick Littlemore so knew whatever we made would be special. I remember standing in Nick's LA home studio screaming into a microphone being egged on by him yelling 'Louder!!!!' so I could get the 'Riveerrrrrrrrrrrrrrrr' just right! I love this track and am very excited to be involved."

Reception
Claire Bracken from ABC said "'River' flows like a dream straight into the bassline of your brain" ending their review saying "Get ready dance floors, this track is coming for you."

The Music called the song "a homage to PNAU's roots in the rave and progressive scenes of the late '90s and 2000s" calling the song "Another Banger."

Hayden Davis from Pilerats called it "one of the brightest songs of the year (and a latecomer for the year's most infectious)".

Track listings
Digital download
 "River" – 3:20

Digital download
 "River" (Tobiahs remix) – 5:03

Digital download
 "River" (Jack Burton remix) – 5:26

Charts

References

2020 songs
2020 singles
Pnau songs
Ladyhawke (musician) songs
Songs written by Nick Littlemore
Songs written by Peter Mayes
Songs written by Sam Littlemore
Songs written by Ladyhawke (musician)